Cirrhochrista cygnalis is a moth in the family Crambidae. It is found in Madagascar.

References

Moths described in 1907
Spilomelinae
Moths of Madagascar